Marcel Esteban Jensen (born February 12, 1990) is a former American football tight end. He was signed as an undrafted free agent by the Jacksonville Jaguars after the 2014 NFL Draft. He played college football at Fresno State.

Professional career

Jacksonville Jaguars
Following the 2014 NFL Draft, Jensen was signed by the Jacksonville Jaguars as an undrafted free agent. He was waived on August 31, 2014 and added to practice squad the same day.  On September 16, the Jaguars promoted Jensen to their 53-man roster. He was released on September 23 and re-signed to the practice squad the next day.  He was placed on injured reserve on October 14.

He was released on May 11, 2015.

Denver Broncos
On May 12, 2015, Jensen was claimed off waivers by the Denver Broncos. On September 5, 2015, he was waived by the Broncos.

Atlanta Falcons
On September 7, 2015, Jensen was signed to the Falcons' practice squad. On November 24, 2015, he was released from practice squad.

Buffalo Bills
Jensen signed to the practice squad of the Buffalo Bills on December 9, 2015.

Washington Redskins
The Washington Redskins signed Jensen off the Bills' practice squad on December 22, 2015. On September 3, 2016, he was waived by the Redskins.

Chicago Bears
On October 10, 2016, Jensen was signed to the Bears' practice squad. He was released by the Bears on October 25, 2016.

Philadelphia Eagles
On November 14, 2016, Jensen was signed to the Eagles' practice squad. He was released on December 20, 2016.

Personal life
He is married to his wife, Che'mique. They have a son, Josiah and daughter Ariah

References

External links
Washington Redskins bio
Jacksonville Jaguars bio
Fresno State Bulldogs bio

1990 births
American football tight ends
Fresno State Bulldogs football players
Living people
People from Fairfield, California
Players of American football from California
Sportspeople from the San Francisco Bay Area
Jacksonville Jaguars players
Denver Broncos players
Atlanta Falcons players
Buffalo Bills players
Washington Redskins players
Chicago Bears players
Philadelphia Eagles players